The Collegiate Conference of the South (CCS) is an athletic conference which competes in the Division III level of the National Collegiate Athletic Association (NCAA).  Member schools are located in Georgia, Tennessee, Alabama, Mississippi, and Kentucky.

The conference was established after a decision was made to split the 19-member USA South Athletic Conference into two smaller, geographically-oriented leagues. While competitive play began immediately during the 2022–23 school year, the CCS will not be eligible for automatic NCAA Division III tournament bids until 2024. The conference sponsors 14 championship sports. Football, women's golf, and men's and women's lacrosse teams sponsored by CCS members continue to compete in the USA South as associate members.

Member schools

Founding members
The CCS began with nine full members, all private and faith-based schools, with only Berea not being tied to one or more specific Christian denominations.

Notes

Membership timeline

Sports
The CCS sponsors championships in the following sports:

Conference facilities
All CCS members with football teams play that sport in the USA South.

See also
 USA South Athletic Conference
 Great South Athletic Conference – former Division III conference with similar membership and geographic footprint

References

External links
 Official website